Davlekanovo (Däwläkän) is a town in the Republic of Bashkortostan, Russia, located on the Dyoma River  west of Ufa. Population:  It was previously known as Itkulovo.

History
In the mid-18th century it was called Itkulovo; later renamed Davlekanovo. Urban-type settlement status was granted to it in 1928 and town status was granted in 1942.

Administrative and municipal status
Within the framework of administrative divisions, Davlekanovo serves as the administrative center of Davlekanovsky District, even though it is not a part of it. As an administrative division, it is incorporated separately as the town of republic significance of Davlekanovo—an administrative unit with the status equal to that of the districts. As a municipal division, the town of republic significance of Davlekanovo is incorporated within Davlekanovsky Municipal District as Davlekanovo Urban Settlement.

Climate

Demographics
Ethnic composition:
Russians: 36%
Bashkirs: 32%
Tatars: 20%
Chuvash people: 5%
Ukrainians: 5%
others: 2%

References

Notes

Sources

External links
Official website of Davlekanovo 
Davlekanovo Business Directory 

Cities and towns in Bashkortostan
Populated places established in 1928